Ephraim Douglass Adams (December 18, 1865 in Decorah, Iowa – September 1, 1930 in Stanford, California) was an American educator and historian, regarded as an expert on the American Civil War and British-American relations.  He was known as a great teacher, with the ability to inspire teachers and researchers, and his presentation style was copied by Stanford historian Thomas A. Bailey.

Born in Iowa in 1865, he graduated from the University of Michigan in 1887, earning a Ph.D. in 1890.  In the same year he was appointed special agent in charge of street railways for the 11th (1890 U.S. Census). His earlier work was done at the University of Kansas, where he became assistant professor (1891) and associate professor (1894) of history and sociology, and in 1899 professor of European history.  In 1902 he was made associate professor of history in Leland Stanford Junior University, and in 1906, full professor of history at Stanford University.  His work is widely cited. 
He is best known for The Power of Ideals in American History (1913).

Bibliography
 The Control of the Purse in the United States Government (1894)
 The Influence of Grenville on Pitt's Foreign Policy, 1787-1798 (1904)
 British Interests and Activities in Texas, 1838-1846 (Albert Shaw Lectures, Johns Hopkins University, 1910)
 Lord Ashburton and the Treaty of Washington (1912)
 The Power of Ideals in American History (1913)
 Great Britain and the American Civil War (2 vols.) (1925)

References

External links 
 
 
 Ephraim Douglass Adams Papers

American political writers
American male non-fiction writers
People from Decorah, Iowa
University of Michigan alumni
1865 births
1930 deaths
Stanford University Department of History faculty
Educators from Iowa
Historians from Iowa